Klocker is a surname. Notable people with the surname include:

Dieter Klöcker (1936–2011), German clarinetist
Edit Klocker (born 1979), Hungarian swimmer
Hans Klocker (before 1474–after 1500), sculptor
Wolfgang Klocker (born 1971), Austrian ski mountaineer